"Project Fear" is a term that has entered common usage in British politics in the 21st century, mainly in relation to two major referendum debates: the 2014 Scottish independence referendum, and then again during and after the 2016 UK referendum on EU membership (Brexit).

The phrase has been used to characterise claims of economic and socio-political dangers—primarily those that would result from a change to the existing political status quo—as scaremongering and pessimism.

2014 Scottish independence referendum
The phrase was coined by Rob Shorthouse, who was the "Better Together" campaign's director of communications during the Scottish independence referendum and first appeared in Scotland's Herald newspaper in 2013. It was originally intended as a joke, “an ironic suggestion for Yes Scotland – a handy name it could use in its constant complaints about Better Together’s alleged Unionist scaremongering”. However it was subsequently adopted by Scottish nationalists after Shorthouse used it in conversation with journalists at the Scottish Conservatives party conference in June 2013 and it entered print. Scottish National Party leader Alex Salmond used it to taunt unionist campaigner Alistair Darling during a televised debate.

2016 EU membership referendum
It later reappeared during EU membership referendum campaigning ahead of the 2016 UK referendum on EU membership, being used to criticise the campaign being run by Britain Stronger in Europe, supporters of the UK remaining in the European Union. Former Mayor of London and key figurehead of the Leave campaign Boris Johnson re-introduced the term. He put forward claims that the pro-EU campaign was guilty of scaremongering, saying that "the agents of Project Fear" were trying to "spook" the British public into voting against British withdrawal from the European Union.

The phrase was also used by those who were in favour of Britain remaining within the European Union, Labour Shadow Chancellor John McDonnell said that "The EU referendum is about our future relationship with Europe, not who is the next leader of the Tory Party ... the Labour leadership will not go anywhere near the Tories' 'project fear' campaign on both sides of the debate. But instead we will continue to set out the positive case to 'Remain and Reform' the EU to create 'Another Europe' ... Another Europe is not just possible but urgently and vitally needed, which is why we must reject the offer of a Tory Brexit.".

In a speech, Remain campaigner Alistair Darling said "Project Fear? In fact, it is a reality check. The kind anyone would take before making such an enormous decision in their lives." David Cameron, who resigned as Prime Minister after the referendum result, rejected any allegations of fear-mongering, saying that "The only project I'm interested in is Project Fact. Project Fact is about saying: 'Stay in and you know what you'll get.'" Others, such as the Mayor of London Sadiq Khan, have stated that the Leave side had also been scaremongering with false claims of imminent Turkish accession to the EU.

Wider use
In late September 2020, Conservative MP Desmond Swayne used the term "Project Fear" when dismissing a COVID-19 presentation by government scientists Chris Whitty and Patrick Vallance, in which they warned of 50,000 cases per day by mid-October unless urgent action was taken. He called it "an attempt to terrify the British people". From January 2020 through September 2020, the count was typically below 1,000 cases per day though, in April 2020, it ranged between 3,000 and 4,800 cases per day. It was rising in late September and had reached 8,600 cases on 28 September. The UK did see 20,000 cases per day in October 2020. In the last week of December 2020, the UK had a seven day average of over 50,000 cases per day (and over 150,000 cases per day a year later, in December 2021).

In May 2021, Conservative MP Steve Baker described the UK's target for cutting its annual emissions of greenhouse gases to net zero by 2050 as Project Fear following his appointment as a trustee of the Global Warming Policy Foundation, a lobby group that opposes climate change legislation.

See also
 Gevald campaign

References

2012 establishments in Scotland
2012 in British politics
2016 in Gibraltar
Cross-party campaigns
Euroscepticism in the United Kingdom
Referendums related to the European Union
Scottish Conservative Party
Scottish Labour
Scottish Liberal Democrats
2016 United Kingdom European Union membership referendum
Political campaigns in the United Kingdom
Unionism in Scotland
2014 Scottish independence referendum
2012 in the European Union
2014 in the European Union
2016 in the European Union
British political phrases